Yeddioymaq or Yeddioymak may refer to:
Yeddioymaq, Bilasuvar, Azerbaijan
Yeddioymaq, Masally (disambiguation), Azerbaijan
Birinci Yeddioymaq, Azerbaijan
İkinci Yeddioymaq, Azerbaijan